The Sun Down Limited is a 1924 American short silent comedy film directed by Robert F. McGowan. It was the 30th Our Gang short subject released. The title is a play on the Southern Pacific Railroad's Sunset Limited train service. The Sun Down Limited was remade in 1929 during the sound era as Railroadin'.

Plot
The gang play around the railyard until Joe and Mickey get them kicked out for taking an engine for a joyride. The kids try to play with Toughy and his train but are rebuked, so they build their own railroad instead. When the girls leave Toughy for the gang's railroad, a jealous Toughy runs the gangs train off the tracks and into the city streets.

Cast

The Gang
 Joe Cobb as Joe
 Jackie Condon as Jackie
 Mickey Daniels as Mickey
 Allen Hoskins as Farina
 Mary Kornman as Mary
 Andy Samuel as Andy
 Sonny Loy as Sing Joy

Additional cast
 Ivadell Carter as Mary's friend
 Gabe Saienz as Toughey
 Lassie Lou Ahern as train passenger
 Peggy Ahern as train passenger
 Pal the Dog as Toughey's dog

References

External links
 
 

1924 films
1924 comedy films
1924 short films
American silent short films
American black-and-white films
Films directed by Robert F. McGowan
Hal Roach Studios short films
Our Gang films
1920s American films
Silent American comedy films